State secret may refer to:

 Classified information, about state secrets in government
 State Secret (1950 film), a British film
 State Secret (1995 film), an Italian film

See also
 State secrets privilege, about the origin of the doctrine of state secrets in the United States